Moneyfields Football Club is a football club based in Portsmouth, England. Affiliated to the Hampshire FA, they were founded in 1987 as Portsmouth Civil Service, before adopting their current name in 1994.

History
The club was originally known as Portsmouth Civil Service and played in the Portsmouth Saturday League. In 1990–91 they won the Portsmouth Senior Cup and the Portsmouth Saturday League Premier Division, earning promotion to Division Three of the Hampshire League. The club retained the Portsmouth Senior Cup the following season, as well as winning the Hampshire Intermediate Cup and the Division Three title, resulting in promotion to Division Two. They retained the Hampshire Intermediate Cup and won Division Two in 1992–93, securing a third successive promotion, this time to Division One of the Hampshire League. In 1994 the club was renamed Moneyfields.

In 1996–97 Moneyfields were Division One champions. After finishing as runners-up the following season, the club were promoted to the Wessex League. They became members of Division One when the league merged with the Hampshire League in 2004, with Division One being renamed the Premier Division in 2005. The club won the Portsmouth Senior Cup again in 2012–13. In 2016–17 they were Premier Division runners-up and were promoted to Division One East of the Southern League after champions Portland United declined promotion.

After being moved into Division One South for the 2018–19 season, Moneyfields finished fourth in the division, qualifying for the promotion playoffs and won the Portsmouth Senior Cup. However, they were beaten by Yate Town in the semi-finals, losing 5–4 on penalties after a 1–1 draw. They retained the Portsmouth Senior Cup in 2019–20, although the final was not played until May 2021 due to the COVID-19 pandemic. In 2021 Moneyfields were voluntarily relegated back to the Premier Division of the Wessex League.

Ground
The club played at Copnor Road until moving to the Moneyfields Sports Ground in 1994. Prior to 1994, Moneyfields Sports Ground was once the former training ground facility of Portsmouth, and was simply known as 'Moneyfields', due to its location in Moneyfield Avenue in Baffins, Portsmouth.

The club relocated to Havant & Waterlooville's Westleigh Park for the 2022–23 season due to ground redevelopment work at the Moneyfields Sports Ground.

Honours
Hampshire League
Division One champions 1996–97
Division Two champions 1992–93
Division Three champions 1991–92
Portsmouth Saturday League
Premier Division champions 1990–91
Portsmouth Senior Cup
Winners 1990–91, 1991–92, 2012–13, 2018–19, 2019–20
Hampshire Intermediate Cup
Winners 1991–92, 1992–93

Records
Best FA Cup performance: Third qualifying round, 2018–19
Best FA Trophy performance: First round, 2020–21
Best FA Vase performance: Fourth round, 2015–16
Record attendance: 1,012 vs AFC Portchester, Wessex League Premier Division, 27 December 2022 
Biggest win: 9–0 vs Blackfield & Langley, Wessex League, 3 November 2001
Most goals in a season: Warren Hunt, 35 (2010–11)

See also
Moneyfields F.C. players

References

External links

Football clubs in England
Football clubs in Hampshire
Association football clubs established in 1987
1987 establishments in England
Sport in Portsmouth
Portsmouth Saturday Football League
Hampshire League
Wessex Football League
Southern Football League clubs
Financial services association football clubs in England